Bibaho Diaries (2017) is an Indian Bengali-language romantic comedy film directed by Mainak Bhaumik and produced by Rupa Datta, under the banner of Camellia Productions. It stars Ritwick Chakraborty and Sohini Sarkar in lead roles. A sequel of the movie is in the offing.

Plot 
This story about what a couple today looks like under a microscope before and also after marriage.

Controversy 
Prior to the release of the film, director Mainak Bhaumik was accused of copying his own film, Ami vs Tumi. Arijit Biswas, who holds complete rights to the film Ami vs Tumi, filed a complaint with the Eastern India Motion Pictures Association (EIMPA).

Awards 

 Best Bengali Film (2017) - by Hyderabad Bengali Film Festival
 Jio Filmfare Awards (East) (2018) - nomination

Soundtrack

References

External links

Bengali-language Indian films
2010s Bengali-language films
Films scored by Savvy Gupta
2017 films
Indian romantic comedy films
Films directed by Mainak Bhaumik